Rhynchospora scirpoides, also referred to as Psilocarya scirpoides; common names long-beaked beaksedge and long-beaked bald rush; is a plant in the Rhynchospora genus found in North America.

Conservation status
It is listed as endangered in Connecticut and Rhode Island. It is listed as threatened Indiana, Maryland and Michigan. It is listed as special concern in Massachusetts and as rare in New York (state).

References

scirpoides
Flora of North America